The 2018 United States House of Representatives elections in North Carolina were held on November 6, 2018, electing the thirteen U.S. representatives from the State of North Carolina, one from each of the state's congressional districts. The elections coincided with other elections to the House of Representatives, as well as elections to the United States Senate and various state and local elections.

Primary elections in twelve of the thirteen districts were held on May 8, 2018.

Results summary

Statewide

District
Results of the 2018 United States House of Representatives elections in North Carolina by district:

District 1

The incumbent is Democrat G. K. Butterfield, who has represented the district since 2004. Butterfield was re-elected with 69% of the vote in 2016.

Democratic primary

Candidates

Nominee
 G. K. Butterfield, incumbent U.S. Representative

Republican primary

Candidates

Nominee
 Roger Allison, businessman

General election

Endorsements

Results

District 2

The incumbent is Republican George Holding, who has represented the district since 2017. Holding was elected with 57% of the vote in 2016.

The Democratic Congressional Campaign Committee included North Carolina's 2nd congressional district on its initial list of Republican-held seats considered targets in 2018.

Republican primary

Candidates

Nominee
 George Holding, incumbent U.S. Representative

Eliminated in primary
 Allen Chesser II, law enforcement officer

Primary results

Democratic primary

Candidates

Nominee
 Linda Coleman, former state representative and nominee for lieutenant governor in 2012 & 2016

Eliminated in primary
 Wendy May, military veteran and former firefighter, minister and journalist
 Ken Romley, entrepreneur

Withdrawn
 Sam Searcy, business executive (running for state senate)

Endorsements

Primary results

Libertarian primary

Candidates

Nominee
 Jeff Matemu

General election

Endorsements

Polling

Predictions

Results

District 3

The incumbent is Republican Walter B. Jones Jr., who has represented the district since 1995. Jones was re-elected with 67% of the vote in 2016.

Republican primary

Candidates

Nominee
 Walter B. Jones Jr., incumbent U.S. Representative

Eliminated in primary
 Scott Dacey, Vice-Chairman of the Craven County Board of Commissioners
 Phil Law, former U.S. Marine

Endorsements

Primary results

General election

Results

District 4

The incumbent is Democrat David Price, who has represented the district since 1997. Price was re-elected with 68% of the vote in 2016.

Democratic primary

Candidates

Nominee
 David Price, incumbent U.S. Representative

Eliminated in primary
 Michelle Laws, professor
 Richard Lee Watkins III, academic

Endorsements

Primary results

Republican primary

Candidates

Nominee
 Steve Von Loor, business owner

Withdrawn
 Lee Brian, videographer

Libertarian primary

Candidates

Nominee
 Barbara Howe, homemaker

Eliminated in primary
 Scerry Whitlock

Primary results

General election

Endorsements

Results

District 5

The incumbent is Republican Virginia Foxx, who has represented the district since 2005. Foxx was re-elected with 58% of the vote in 2016.

Republican primary

Candidates

Nominee
 Virginia Foxx, incumbent U.S. Representative

Eliminated in primary
 Dillon Gentry, salesman
 Cortland J. Meader, doctor
 Matthew Vera, high school coach

Primary results

Republican primary

Candidates

Nominee
 Denise D. Adams, Winston-Salem city council member

Eliminated in primary
 Jenny Marshall, teacher

Primary results

General election

Endorsements

Results

District 6

The incumbent is Republican Mark Walker, who has represented the district since 2015. Walker was re-elected with 59% of the vote in 2016.

Republican primary

Candidates

Nominee
 Mark Walker, incumbent U.S. Representative

Democratic primary

Candidates

Nominee
 Ryan Watts, businessman

Eliminated in primary
 Gerald Wong, trucker

Endorsements

Primary results

General election

Endorsements

Predictions

Results

District 7

The incumbent is Republican David Rouzer, who has represented the district since 2015. Rouzer was re-elected with 61% of the vote in 2016.

Republican primary

Candidates

Nominee
 David Rouzer, incumbent U.S. Representative

Democratic primary

Candidates

Nominee
 Kyle Horton, physician

Eliminated in primary
 Grayson Parker, consultant

Primary results

General election

Endorsements

Polling

Predictions

Results

District 8

The incumbent is Republican Richard Hudson, who has represented the district since 2013. Hudson was re-elected with 59% of the vote in 2016.

The Democratic Congressional Campaign Committee included North Carolina's 8th congressional district on its initial list of Republican-held seats considered targets in 2018.

Republican primary

Candidates

Nominee
 Richard Hudson, incumbent U.S. Representative

Democratic primary

Candidates

Nominee
 Frank McNeill, former mayor of Aberdeen

Eliminated in primary
 Scott Huffman, small business owner
 Marc Tiegel, businessman

Endorsements

Primary results

General election

Endorsements

Predictions

Results

District 9

The incumbent, Republican Robert Pittenger, lost his party's nomination to Mark Harris. Pittenger had represented the district since 2013 and had been re-elected with 58% of the vote in the general election of 2016.

The results of the election were voided and the seat remained vacant until a special election was held in 2019.

Republican primary

Candidates

Nominee
 Mark Harris, pastor

Eliminated in primary
 Clarence Goins, banker
 Robert Pittenger, incumbent U.S. Representative

Primary results

Democratic primary
 Dan McCready, entrepreneur and U.S. Marine Iraq war veteran

Eliminated in primary 
 Christian Cano, hotel manager & hospitality consultant and nominee for this district in 2016

Primary results

Libertarian primary

Candidates

Nominee
 Jeff Scott

General election

Debates
Complete video of debate, October 10, 2018

Endorsements

Polling

Predictions

Results

On November 27, 2018, the State Board of Elections declined to certify the election result in this congressional district, while certifying all the others, pending investigation of unspecified "potential wrongdoing". An investigation was opened focusing on McCrae Dowless, a political operative who was hired by the Harris campaign for get-out-the-vote work, and allegations of irregularities involving the collection of absentee ballots. On December 28, 2018, incoming House Majority Leader Steny Hoyer stated House Democrats' official position of declining to seat Harris on January 3. A new election was called.

District 10

The incumbent is Republican Patrick McHenry, who has represented the district since 2005. McHenry was re-elected with 63% of the vote in 2016.

Republican primary

Candidates

Nominee
 Patrick McHenry, incumbent U.S. Representative

Eliminated in primary
 Seth Blankenship
 Gina Collias, attorney
 Jeff Gregory, postmaster and candidate for this seat in 2016
 Ira Roberts, former intelligence officer for the Army National Guard
 Albert Wiley, Jr., physician & professor and candidate for this seat in 2016

Primary results

Democratic primary

Candidates

Nominee
 David Wilson Brown, IT consultant

General election

Endorsements

Results

District 11

The incumbent is Republican Mark Meadows, who has represented the district since 2013. Meadows was re-elected with 64% of the vote in 2016.

Republican primary

Candidates

Nominee
 Mark Meadows, incumbent U.S. Representative

Eliminated in primary
 Chuck Archerd

Primary results

Democratic primary

Candidates

Nominee
 Phillip Price, business owner

Eliminated in primary
 Scott Donaldson, urologist
 Steve Woodsmall, former U.S. Air Force officer

Endorsements

Primary results

Libertarian primary

Candidates

Nominee
 Clifton Ingram

General election

Endorsements

Results

District 12

The incumbent is Democrat Alma Adams, who has represented the district since 2014. Adams was re-elected with 67% of the vote in 2016.

Democratic primary

Candidates

Nominee
 Alma Adams, incumbent U.S. Representative

Eliminated in primary
 Gabe Ortiz
 Patrick Register, food service worker
 Keith Young, Asheville city councilman

Endorsements

Primary results

Republican primary

Candidates

Nominee
 Paul Wright, attorney, former District Court & Superior Court judge, candidate for Governor of North Carolina in 2012, nominee for North Carolina's 4th congressional district in 2014, candidate for U.S. Senate in 2016 and candidate for this seat in 2016

Eliminated in primary
 Paul Bonham, teacher and solar consultant
 Carl Persson

Primary results

General election

Endorsements

Results

District 13

The incumbent is Republican Ted Budd, who has represented the district since 2017. Budd was elected with 56% of the vote in 2016.

Republican primary

Candidates

Nominee
 Ted Budd, incumbent U.S. Representative

Democratic primary

Candidates

Nominee
 Kathy Manning, attorney

Eliminated in primary
 Adam Coker, trucker

Endorsements

Primary results

Libertarian primary

Candidates

Nominee
 Tom Bailey

General election

Endorsements

Polling

Predictions

Results

References

External links
Candidates at Vote Smart
Candidates at Ballotpedia
Campaign finance at FEC
Campaign finance at OpenSecrets

Official campaign websites for first district candidates
G. K. Butterfield (D) for Congress
Roger Allison (R) for Congress

Official campaign websites for second district candidates
Linda Coleman (D) for Congress
George Holding (R) for Congress

Official campaign websites for third district candidates
Walter Jones (R) for Congress

Official campaign websites for fourth district candidates
David Price (D) for Congress
Steve Von Loor (R) for Congress
Barbara Howe (L) for Congress

Official campaign websites for fifth district candidates
Denise D. Adams (D) for Congress
Virginia Foxx (R) for Congress

Official campaign websites for sixth district candidates
Mark Walker (R) for Congress
Ryan Watts (D) for Congress

Official campaign websites for seventh district candidates
David Fallin (C) for Congress
Kyle Horton (D) for Congress
David Rouzer (R) for Congress

Official campaign websites for eighth district candidates
Richard Hudson (R) for Congress
Frank McNeill (D) for Congress

Official campaign websites for ninth district candidates
Mark Harris (R) for Congress
Dan McCready (D) for Congress

Official campaign websites for tenth district candidates
David Wilson Brown (D) for Congress
Samaria Graham (I) for Congress
Patrick McHenry (R) for Congress

Official campaign websites for eleventh district candidates
Mark Meadows (R) for Congress
Phillip Price (D) for Congress

Official campaign websites for twelfth district candidates
Alma Adams (D) for Congress
Paul Wright (R) for Congress

Official campaign websites for thirteenth district candidates
Ted Budd (R) for Congress
Kathy Manning (D) for Congress

North Carolina
House
United States House of Representatives elections in North Carolina